The S.S.P. Mills and Son Building was a historic commercial building at the northwest corner of Texarkana Avenue and Main Street in Wilton, Arkansas, between the railroad tracks and United States Route 71.  It was a single-story panel brick building, built by a local landowner and merchant for his commercial activities.  It was designed by Witt, Seibert & Company of Texarkana, and built in 1912.  It was one of the few commercial buildings in Wilton to survive from the growth period after the arrival of the railroad in the city.

The building was listed on the National Register of Historic Places in 1996.  It was demolished in 2016, and removed from the Register in 2017.

See also
National Register of Historic Places listings in Little River County, Arkansas

References

Commercial buildings on the National Register of Historic Places in Arkansas
Buildings and structures completed in 1912
Buildings and structures in Little River County, Arkansas
1912 establishments in Arkansas
National Register of Historic Places in Little River County, Arkansas
Former National Register of Historic Places in Arkansas
Demolished buildings and structures in Arkansas
Buildings and structures demolished in 2016